Body at Brighton Rock is a 2019 American horror thriller film, directed, written, and produced by Roxanne Benjamin. It stars Karina Fontes, Casey Adams, Emily Althaus, Miranda Bailey, Martin Spanjers, Matt Peters, Susan Burke and John Getz.

It had its world premiere at South by Southwest on March 8, 2019 and was released on April 26, 2019, by Magnet Pictures. The film received mixed reviews from critics.

Premise
Wendy, a part-time summer employee at a mountainous state park, takes on a rough trail assignment at the end of the season, trying to prove to her friends that she's capable enough to do the job. When she takes a wrong turn and ends up deep in the backcountry, she stumbles upon a potential crime scene. Stuck with no communication after losing her radio and with orders to guard the site, Wendy must fight the urge to run.

Cast
 Karina Fontes as Wendy
 Casey Adams as Red
 Emily Althaus as Maya
 Miranda Bailey as Sandra
 Martin Spanjers as Davey
 Matt Peters as Kevin
 Susan Burke as Coroner
 John Getz as Sheriff
 Brodie Reed as Craig
 John Beach (actor)  as Chip

Production 
Filming took place over ten days in December 2017, with an additional two days in February 2018, in Idylwild, California.

Release
In January 2018, Magnet Releasing acquired distribution rights to the film. It had its world premiere at South by Southwest on March 8, 2019. It was released on April 26, 2019.

Critical reception
The website's critics consensus reads, "Body at Brighton Rock leaves some of its thrilling potential untapped, but the end result remains a solidly crafted outing that should entertain horror fans." On Metacritic, the film has a weighted average score of 53 out of 100, based on 11 critics, indicating "generally positive reviews".

References

External links
 
 
 

2019 films
2019 horror films
2019 horror thriller films
American horror thriller films
2019 directorial debut films
2010s English-language films
Films directed by Roxanne Benjamin
2010s American films